Brian Hagan is an artist whose work has appeared in role-playing games.

Education
Brian Hagan graduated from Savannah College of Art and Design in 1994.

Career
His Dungeons & Dragons work includes interior art and the back cover illustration for the fourth edition Dungeon Master's Guide (2008), and interior art for Dungeon Master's Guide II (2005), Spell Compendium (2005), Races of the Dragon (2006), Tome of Magic (2006), The Shattered Gates of Slaughtergarde (2006), Dragon Magic (2006), Cityscape (2006), Dungeonscape (2007), Magic Item Compendium (2007), Expedition to the Demonweb Pits (2007), Expedition to the Ruins of Greyhawk (2007), Pyramid of Shadows (2008), and Martial Power (2008).

He did art for the comic book series Pantheon.

He is known for his work on the Magic: The Gathering collectible card game.

References

External links
 Brian Hagan's website

Living people
Place of birth missing (living people)
Role-playing game artists
Savannah College of Art and Design alumni
Year of birth missing (living people)